Thomas F. Patton (born November 3, 1953) is the state representative for the 7th District of the Ohio House of Representatives. He is a Republican. The district consists of Berea, North Olmsted, North Royalton, Olmsted Falls, Strongsville as well as Olmsted Township in Cuyahoga County.

Patton previously represented the same district from 2003 to 2008, and was a member of the Ohio Senate from 2008 to 2016, serving for a time as that body's Majority Leader.

Career
Born and raised in Cleveland, Ohio, Patton is a member the Knights of Columbus, the Cleveland Police Historical Society, the AFL-CIO and serves as president of the Treasurers and Ticket Sellers Local 756.

With newly drawn district lines following redistricting in 2002, Patton was one of five Republicans who sought to succeed incumbent Erin Sullivan.  To take the nomination, Patton received 42.33% of the vote. He went on to defeat Democrat Susan Adams in the general election with 52.4% of the vote. In his first reelection bid, Patton defeated Democrat Bobby Bland with 66.59% of the vote to take a second term. For his third term in House, Patton faced John Celebrezze in 2006. However, he easily defeated his opposition with 58.53% of the electorate.

When incumbent Bob Spada was unable to run for another term in the Ohio Senate in 2008, Patton decided to give up a fourth term in the House to run for the seat.  Unopposed in the primary, Patton went on to defeat Democrat Gary Kucinich, brother of Dennis Kucinich, in the general election with 68.39% of the vote. Spada resigned his seat two months prior to the end of his term in order to take an appointment from Governor Ted Strickland.  Subsequently, Senate Republicans decided to seat Patton early, in order for the Senate to have adequate representation throughout the important lame duck session.  He was seated in the Senate on November 18, 2008.  In 2012, Patton ran successfully for a second term, defeating Democrat Jennifer Brady with 59.16% of the vote.

Ohio House of Representatives
Term-limited in the Senate in 2016, Patton succeeded in convincing Representative Mike Dovilla to run for his Senate seat, allowing for Patton to return to the House. Opposed in the Republican primary, Patton handily defeated Jennifer M. Herold, 79% to 21%. Dovilla lost the Republican primary for Patton's Senate seat to Matt Dolan.

Patton was unopposed in the general election, winning a seat that on paper is one of the most competitive in the state.  He was sworn in for his fourth non-consecutive term in the House on January 3, 2017.

Committee Memberships 
Aging and Long Term Care
Finance
Public Utilities
Rules and Reference
Transportation and Public Safety
Finance Subcommittee on Transportation

Run for Congress 
Patton announced on July 31, 2017 his intention to seek the Republican nomination for Ohio's 16th Congressional District.

Criticism

Jimmy Dimora Trial
During the trial of former Cuyahoga County Commissioner Jimmy Dimora, Patton was accused of bribing former Parma School Board member J. Kevin Kelley. Patton's third cousin, Kelley had already pleaded guilty to several counts of corruption related crimes when he testified under oath as to accepting the bribes from Patton. Patton denied the claim.

Controversial comments  
In an interview on America's Workforce Radio, Patton referred to his opponent, Jennifer Herold, as "gal" and "sweetie". In addition, he questioned her ability to serve because she is a mother of young children.

The comments generated national coverage. Numerous outlets such as Cosmopolitan, Gawker, and The Christian Science Monitor editorialized the story. Nate Beeler of The Columbus Dispatch also covered it, creating a cartoon regarding the comments.

References

External links
 The Ohio House of Representatives - Rep. Thomas F. Patton (official site)

1953 births
Living people
Politicians from Cleveland
Republican Party Ohio state senators
Republican Party members of the Ohio House of Representatives
People from Strongsville, Ohio
21st-century American politicians
Cleveland State University alumni